CSM Roman is a Romanian sports club from Roman, Romania, founded in 1954.

External links 
Official website 

Sports clubs established in 1954
Multi-sport clubs in Romania
CSM Roman
Roman, Romania